Methacrylates are derivatives of methacrylic acid.  These derivatives are mainly used to make poly(methyl methacrylate) and related polymers.

Monomers
 Methyl methacrylate
 Ethyl methacrylate
 Butyl methacrylate
 Hydroxyethyl methacrylate
 Glycidyl methacrylate

Carboxylate anions
Monomers
Methacrylate esters